Rhodopirellula baltica is a bacterium from the genus of Rhodopirellula which has been isolated from brackish water from the Baltic Sea.

References

Further reading 
 

Bacteria described in 2004
Planctomycetota